Semidomka is a rural locality (a selo) in Semidomsky Selsoviet of Konstantinovsky District, Amur Oblast, Russia. The population was 281 as of 2018. There are 10 streets.

Geography 
Semidomka is located 26 km northwest of Konstantinovka (the district's administrative centre) by road. Kovrizhka is the nearest rural locality.

References 

Rural localities in Konstantinovsky District